The Bullfighters is the penultimate feature film starring Laurel and Hardy, the sixth and final film the duo made under 20th Century Fox as well as the last released in the United States.

Plot
Private detectives Stan Laurel and Oliver Hardy travel from their hometown of Peoria, Illinois to Mexico City in pursuit of an infamous female larcenist named Hattie Blake (Carol Andrews), who is publicly known as ”Larceny Nell”. Meanwhile, an American sports promoter, Richard K. Muldoon (Ralph Sanford) meets with publicity man ”Hot Shot” Coleman (Richard Lane), and his assistant (Irving Gump) to discuss an upcoming bullfight featuring famed Spanish matador Don Sebastian. But when Muldoon sees pictures of the bullfighter he becomes enraged; Don Sebastian looks exactly like Laurel. Hot Shot is confused until Muldoon tells him the story: Eight years earlier in Peoria, Laurel and Hardy both testified against Muldoon in a criminal case, and Muldoon was wrongfully convicted of the crime (the details of which were never specified) and granted a twenty-year jail sentence; However, after five years the true criminal confessed to the crime and Muldoon was released. But while in prison he lost his home, his wife, his fortune and his business and had to start all over in Mexico. He still holds a grudge against Stan and Ollie and vows revenge with a large knife for emphasis: "Someday I'll run across them again! And when I do, I'm going to skin them alive! First the little one, then the big one! I'm going to skin them BOTH alive!!"

Meanwhile, Ollie and Stan confront Blake in an attempt to arrest her only for her to snatch the extradition papers that permit them to arrest her outside the U.S., followed by an egg-breaking tit for tat sequence before she escape. They run into Hot Shot who sees Stan's uncanny resemblance to the bullfighter while receiving a telegram that tells the real Don Sebastian's arrival is delayed because of passport trouble. After explaining Stan's resemblance to Don Sebastian to the confused Ollie and Stan and about the vengeful Muldoon's wrongful conviction, Hot Shot forces Stan to impersonate the bullfighter in the meantime, threatening to reveal his and Ollie's presence to Muldoon if he does not cooperate but promising them a very handsome payment for their trouble if he does. Stan reluctantly agrees, only because Hot Shot promises he will not have to fight bulls. Eventually, the real Don Sebastian's passport trouble turns out to be worse than originally feared and so Stan will have to take his place in the ring and fight bulls after all.

On the day of the fight Stan, nervous about fighting bulls, gets drunk. But then, unbeknownst to anyone, the real Don Sebastian has somehow miraculously contrived to making it to Mexico City just in time for the big bullfight. Ollie mistakes him for Stan and forces him into the arena. Stan staggers up, and Hardy sends him into battle. With two Laurels in the ring, the outraged spectators cry foul, especially Muldoon, who now recognizes "Don Sebastian" as Stan Laurel from Peoria who sent him up for twenty years and, in a livid frenzy, punches out Hot Shot, calling him a swindler. Every bull in the arena is then unleashed. Stan and Ollie try to escape the vengeful Muldoon, but not fast enough; Stan and Ollie, while packing for their flight back home and planning to sneak away to the airport, discover Muldoon hiding in their closet, his knife handy. Just as promised, he skins them alive; leaving them, except their heads, in bare bones. Ollie says his "another nice mess…" catchphrase to Stan. Stan whimpers before Ollie decides that they go back home to Peoria, "where we belong!"

Production
Laurel wrote and directed portions of the feature., which was produced in late 1944 and released in May 1945. The revenge plot was reworked from their short film Going Bye-Bye! (1934), and a tit for tat egg-breaking sequence was reprised from the MGM all-star feature Hollywood Party, in which the team appeared in guest roles. This was Laurel and Hardy's last American film and also the film debut of Frank McCown, who later became famous as Rory Calhoun.

Laurel and Hardy were scheduled to make another film for 20th Century-Fox in the spring of 1945, but the studio discontinued all B-picture production at the end of 1944 and closed the Laurel and Hardy unit. When The Bullfighters became a hit, the studio offered to reopen the entire B department just for Laurel and Hardy, but the comedians declined. Thus, The Bullfighters turned out to be Laurel & Hardy's final American film. (Their final film, Atoll K, was produced in France in 1950–51.)

Cast

References

External links

 
 
 
 

1945 films
Laurel and Hardy (film series)
Films directed by Malcolm St. Clair
1945 comedy films
Films directed by Stan Laurel
Films scored by David Buttolph
Films set in Mexico
20th Century Fox films
Bullfighting films
American black-and-white films
1940s English-language films
Films about cattle
1940s American films